The 2019–20 Círculo Gijón season is the third in existence and their second season in LEB Plata, the Spanish third division.

Overview

Pre-season
Despite being relegated to Liga EBA at the end of the previous season, Círculo Gijón remained in the league as a result of a swap of places with Baskonia B, that finished one position over the geometrics.

Season
The season was suspended due to COVID-19 pandemic.

Players

Squad information

Transactions

In
Only Menéndez and Moro continue in the team. Captain Saúl Blanco left the team for joining French Pro B team Gries.

|}

Out

|}

Pre-season and friendlies

Trofeo Principado de Asturias

LEB Plata

First stage

League table (Group West)

Results summary

Results by round

Matches

References

External links
 Official website
 LEB Plata and Círculo Gijón roster at Asturcesto

Circulo
Círculo Gijón seasons